Derrick Lamar Robinson (born September 28, 1987) is an American former professional baseball outfielder. He played in Major League Baseball (MLB) for the Cincinnati Reds in 2013.

Career

Kansas City Royals
Robinson was drafted by the Kansas City Royals in the fourth round of the 2006 Major League Baseball Draft. He was named the left-fielder for the 2012 Minor League Rawlings Gold Glove Award team. The Royals designated Robinson for assignment on November 20, 2012.

Cincinnati Reds
Robinson signed with the Cincinnati Reds before the 2013 season, and featured in 109 games as a rookie with the Reds. He was designated for assignment on November 26, 2013. He became a free agent on December 2, 2013 after being non-tendered by the Reds.

Washington Nationals
On January 23, 2015 he signed a minor league deal with the Washington Nationals. He elected free agency on November 6, 2015.

Sioux City Explorers
Robinson signed with the Sioux City Explorers of the American Association of Independent Professional Baseball and played for them during the 2016 season.

York Revolution
Robinson signed with the York Revolution of the Atlantic League of Professional Baseball for the 2017 season. He became a free agent at the end of the season.

Second Stint with Kansas City Royals
On May 28, 2019, Robinson signed a minor league deal with the Kansas City Royals. He elected free agency on November 4.

Coaching career
Robinson joined the Kansas City Royals organization as a baseball operations intern for the 2020 season. Robinson remained with the organization in 2021 as an outfield, baserunning, and bunting coordinator.

References

External links

1987 births
Living people
African-American baseball players
Cincinnati Reds players
Arizona League Royals players
Burlington Bees players
Wilmington Blue Rocks players
Liga de Béisbol Profesional Roberto Clemente outfielders
Northwest Arkansas Naturals players
Omaha Storm Chasers players
Louisville Bats players
Surprise Rafters players
Cangrejeros de Santurce (baseball) players
Syracuse Chiefs players
Major League Baseball outfielders
Venados de Mazatlán players
Estrellas Orientales players
American expatriate baseball players in the Dominican Republic
Harrisburg Senators players
Sioux City Explorers players
Yaquis de Obregón players
American expatriate baseball players in Mexico
York Revolution players
21st-century African-American sportspeople
20th-century African-American people